Fumiya (written: 郁, 郁也, 郁哉, 史也, 史哉, 史八, 文也, 奎也, ふみや in hiragana or フミヤ in katakana) is a masculine Japanese given name. Notable people with the name include:

, Japanese baseball player
, Japanese musician
, Japanese footballer
, Japanese baseball player
, Japanese footballer
, Japanese footballer
, Japanese footballer
, Japanese baseball player
, Japanese baseball player
, Japanese sumo wrestler
, Japanese Vlogger, Actor, Recording artist
, Japanese singer-songwriter
, Japanese manga artist
, Japanese footballer
, Japanese footballer
, Japanese footballer
, Japanese footballer

Japanese masculine given names